Dorcadion brunneicolle is a species of beetle in the family Cerambycidae. It was described by Kraatz in 1873. It is known from Iran and Iraq.

References

brunneicolle
Beetles described in 1873